"Crybaby" is a song performed by English recording artist Paloma Faith. The song was released as a digital download on 31 August 2017 as the lead single from her fourth studio album The Architect (2017). The song peaked at number 36 on the UK Singles Chart.

Background and composition
"Crybaby" is a "slinky soul-funk" and disco track. The song was written by Paloma Faith, Lindy Robbins, Cleo Tighe and Fin Dow-Smith, with the latter handling production. The song talks about toxic masculinity, with Paloma describing the song's lyrics as "a conversation between a man and I (sic), and the song questions whether global conflicts would cease to exist if men successfully dealt with their feelings. Would things be resolved without attack and with measured discussion?"

Music video 
The dystopian visual for "Crybaby" premiered on 22 September 2017. British actor Wesley Kent-Hargreaves played “Lead Boy”.
The lead Elder, who gives the speech to the boys at the beginning of the video, is the actor Tom Keller.

Track listing

Charts

Certifications

Release history

References

2017 songs
2017 singles
Paloma Faith songs
Songs written by Lindy Robbins
Songs written by Paloma Faith
Songs written by Starsmith
Song recordings produced by Starsmith
Music videos shot in Ukraine
Songs written by Cleo Tighe
RCA Records singles
Sony Music UK singles